The Saskatoon Sheiks/Saskatoon Crescents were a professional ice hockey team in the Western Canada Hockey League (WCHL) and Prairie Hockey League (PrHL) from 1921 to 1928. The team played their home games at the Crescent Arena in Saskatoon, Saskatchewan.

History
The Sheiks entered the WCHL in the 1921–22 season. On February 3, 1922, poor attendance forced the club to move to the Moose Jaw Arena and play as the Moose Jaw Sheiks.

The team was reorganized as the Saskatoon Crescents Hockey Club in April 1922. Frederick E. Betts was appointed chairman of the team's management committee, made the final decision on player contracts, and had a policy of not making statements to the media until a deal was final. Betts signed ten new players to contracts by November in addition to three players who returned from the previous season. He sought to sign Newsy Lalonde from the Montreal Canadiens, and was willing to buy Lalonde's release pending all other National Hockey League clubs waiving their right to claim him. Betts later agreed to trade the rights to highly-touted prospect Aurèle Joliat to bring Lalonde to the Crescents as the team's player-coach for the season. The Crescents won eight of thirty games played, placed fourth during the 1922–23 WCHL season and did not qualify for the playoffs, despite that Lalonde led the league with 30 goals scored.

New ownership took over the team in May 1923. The team continued playing until 1928 when it folded.

Season-by-season record
Note: W = Wins, L = Losses, T = Ties, GF= Goals For, GA = Goals Against, Pts = Points

Head coaches
Bob Pinder (1921–1922)
Newsy Lalonde (1922–1926)

Notable players
 Bun Cook
 Bill Cook
 Harry Cameron
 Corbett Denneny
 Tommy Dunderdale
 George Hainsworth
 Newsy Lalonde
 Rube Brandow

See also
List of pre-NHL seasons
List of ice hockey teams in Saskatchewan

References

1922 establishments in Saskatchewan
1928 disestablishments in Saskatchewan
Defunct ice hockey teams in Canada
Defunct sports teams in Saskatchewan
Ice hockey clubs established in 1922
Ice hockey teams in Saskatchewan
Sport in Saskatoon
Sports clubs disestablished in 1928